Paragehyra is a genus of lizards in the family Gekkonidae (geckos). The genus is endemic to Madagascar.

Species
The genus Paragehyra contains the following species.

Paragehyra austini 
Paragehyra felicitae 
Paragehyra gabriellae 
Paragehyra petiti  – Angel's petite gecko

References

Further reading
Angel F (1929). "Description d'un gecko nouveau, de Madagascar ". Bulletin de la Société Zoologique de France 54: 489-491. (Paragehyra, new genus; P. petiti, new species). (in French).

 
Lizard genera
Taxa named by Fernand Angel